Gorby may refer to:

A nickname for Mikhail Gorbachev, the last leader of the Soviet Union
The Gorbachev Foundation or its website
A talking vehicle cartoon character in Finley the Fire Engine
A place in Izard County, Arkansas, United States 
 Gorby Opera Theater, Glenns Ferry, Idaho, United States